Banks is a small, unincorporated community farming community in northeastern Tunica County, Mississippi. It lies at the intersection of Mississippi Highway 3 and Mississippi Highway 713, several miles east of Tunica Resorts.

Ransom Byrnes first owned the land in 1877.  Banks is named after Richard McPherson Banks, who founded the community in 1900.

The Canadian National Railway, formerly Illinois Central Railroad, passes through Banks.

Banks is also home to T.E. Swindoll & Company, a family owned farm.

References

Unincorporated communities in Tunica County, Mississippi
Unincorporated communities in Mississippi
Memphis metropolitan area